Bob Coecke (born 23 July 1968) is a Belgian theoretical physicist and logician who was professor of Quantum foundations, Logics and Structures at Oxford University until 2020, when he became Chief Scientist of Cambridge Quantum Computing, and after the merger with Honeywell Quantum Systems, Chief Scientist of Quantinuum. In January 2023 he also became Distinguished Visiting Research Chair at the Perimeter Institute for Theoretical Physics.  He pioneered categorical quantum mechanics (entry 18M40 in Mathematics Subject Classification 2020), Quantum Picturalism, ZX-calculus, DisCoCat model for natural language, and quantum natural language processing (QNLP).  He is a founder of the Quantum Physics and Logic community and conference series, and of the applied category theory community, conference series, and diamond-open-access journal Compositionality.

Education and career 
Coecke obtained his Doctorate in Sciences at the Vrije Universiteit Brussel in 1996, and performed postdoctoral work in the Theoretical Physics Group of Imperial College, London in the Category Theory Group of the Mathematics and Statistics Department at McGill University in Montreal, in the Department of Pure Mathematics and Mathematical Statistics of Cambridge University, and in the Department of Computer Science, University of Oxford.

He was an EPSRC Advanced Research Fellow at the Department of Computer Science, University of Oxford, where he became Lecturer in Quantum Computer Science in 2007, and jointly with Samson Abramsky built and headed the Quantum Group, which in 2020 had well over 50 members. In 2009, he worked as visiting scientist at the Perimeter Institute for Theoretical Physics. In July 2011, he was nominated professor of Quantum Foundations, Logics and Structures at Oxford University, with retroactive effect as of October 2010. He was a Governing Body Fellow of Wolfson College, Oxford since 2007, where he now is an Emeritus Fellow.

In January 2019 he became Senior Scientific Advisor of Cambridge Quantum Computing, and in January 2021 he resigned from his Professorship at Oxford, to become Chief Scientist of Cambridge Quantum Computing.  After the merger of Cambridge Quantum Computing with Honeywell Quantum Systems, he stayed on as Chief Scientist of the joint entity Quantinuum.

In January 2023 he also became Distinguished Visiting Research Chair at the Perimeter Institute for Theoretical Physics.

Work 
Coecke's research focuses on the foundations of physics, more particularly category theory, logic, and diagrammatic reasoning, with application to quantum informatics, quantum gravity, and NLP. He has pioneered categorical quantum mechanics together with Samson Abramsky, and spearheaded the development of a diagrammatic quantum formalism based on Penrose graphical notation, on which he wrote a textbook entitled Picturing Quantum Processes with Aleks Kissinger. With Ross Duncan he pioneered ZX-calculus. He pioneered the DisCoCat model for natural language, with Stephen Clark and Mehrnoosh Sadrzadeh. He also pioneered quantum natural language processing (QNLP), with Will Zeng and colleagues at Cambridge Quantum Computing.

Media reception 
The work of Coecke and his co-workers on the application of categorical quantum mechanics to natural language processing in computational linguistics was featured in New Scientist in December 2010. The work on quantum natural language processing was featured in the Quantum Daily in December 2020 and in PhysicsWorld in January 2021.

Publications 
Textbooks
 Bob Coecke, Aleks Kissinger:Picturing Quantum Processes. A First Course in Quantum Theory and Diagrammatic Reasoning, Cambridge University Press, 2017, 
 Bob Coecke, Stefano Gogioso:Quantum in Pictures, Quantinuum, 2022, 

Books (as editor)
 Bob Coecke (ed.): New Structures for Physics, Lecture Notes in Physics 813, Springer, 2011, 
 Bob Coecke, David Moore, Alexander Wilce (eds.): Current Research in Operational Quantum Logic: Algebras, Categories, Languages, Fundamental Theories of Physics, Kluwer Academic, 2010, 

Articles (selection)
 Konstantinos Meichanetzidis, Alexis Toumi, Giovanni de Felice, Bob Coecke: Grammar-Aware Question-Answering on Quantum Computers, arXiv:2012.03756
 Bob Coecke: The Mathematics of Text Structure, arXiv:1904.03478
 Will Zeng, Bob Coecke: Quantum Algorithms for Compositional Natural Language Processing, arXiv:1608.01406
 Bob Coecke, Tobias Fritz, Robert Spekkens: A mathematical theory of resources, arXiv:1409.5531
 Bob Coecke: An Alternative Gospel of structure: order, composition, processes, arxiv:1307.4038
 Bob Coecke, Mehrnoosh Sadrzadeh, Steven Clark: Mathematical Foundations for a Compositional Distributional Model of Meaning, arXiv:1003.4394
 Bob Coecke: Quantum Picturalism, arXiv:0908.1787
 Bob Coecke, Ross Duncan: Interacting quantum observables, Automata, Languages and Programming, pp. 298–310, 2008
 Bob Coecke: Kindergarten quantum mechanics, arXiv:quant-ph/0510032
 Samson Abramsky, Bob Coecke: A categorical semantics of quantum protocols, Proceedings of the 19th Annual IEEE Symposium on Logic in Computer Science, 2004, pp. 415–425

Software articles
 Eduardo Reck Miranda, Richie Yeung, Anna Pearson, Konstantinos Meichanetzidis, Bob Coecke: A quantum natural language processing approach to musical intelligence, arXiv:2111.06741
 Dimitri Kartsaklis, Ian Fan, Richie Yeung, Anna Pearson, Robin Lorenz, Alexis Toumi, Giovanni de Felice, Konstantinos Meichanetzidis, Stephen Clark, Bob Coecke: lambeq: An efficient high-level python library for quantum NLP, arXiv:2110.04236
 Giovanni de Felice, Alexis Toumi, Bob Coecke: Discopy: monoidal categories in Python, arXiv:2111.06741

See also

 Categorical quantum mechanics
 ZX-calculus
 DisCoCat
 Quantum natural language processing
 dagger compact categories
 Applied category theory
 Samson Abramsky

References

External links 
 Publications at Google Scholar
 Publications at DBLP Computer Science Bibliography
 Lectures by Bob Coecke in Perimeter Institute Recorded Seminar Archive (PIRSA)
 Conference series Quantum Physics and Logic
 Conference series Applied Category Theory
 Journal Compositionality

British physicists
Living people
Members of the Department of Computer Science, University of Oxford
Fellows of Wolfson College, Oxford
Vrije Universiteit Brussel alumni
1968 births
Natural language processing researchers
Computational linguistics researchers